State Highway 73 (SH 73) is a State Highway in Kerala, India that starts in Valanchery and ends in Nilambur. The highway is 51.41 km long.

The Route Map 
Valanchery -Angadipuram -Perinthalmanna-Pandikkad-Wandoor-Nilambur

See also 
Roads in Kerala
List of State Highways in Kerala

References 

State Highways in Kerala
Roads in Malappuram district